The Indie Rock Essentials is a compilation album compiled from songs by Blue Sky Black Death. It was released on Babygrande Records on September 1, 2009.

Track listing

Jean Grae albums
Blue Sky Black Death albums
2009 compilation albums
Babygrande Records compilation albums